Two Mothers (German:  Meine Mütter – Spurensuche in Riga)  is a 2007 German documentary film directed by Rosa von Praunheim. The film was shown at the Gothenburg Film Festival and at the Buenos Aires International Festival of Independent Cinema in 2008, among others.

Plot
It was not until 2000 that Rosa von Praunheim learned from his then 94-year-old mother that he had been adopted. Only after the death of his beloved adoptive mother did von Praunheim set out to find traces of his biological parents. The exciting research leads him to the central prison of Riga in Latvia.

Production notes
Two Mothers was a hit in German television.

Awards
 2008: Nomination für den Jury-Award at the Tribeca Film Festival 
 2009: German Biography Prize
 2010: Nomitnaion for the Grimme-Preis

Reception
"The result is extremely exciting - not only as a skilfully staged journey through time to the 1940s, but also as a detective's search for clues, which - after long months without results - suddenly opens the door to the past via a small detail." (Männer-Lifestylemagazin)

References

External links

Films directed by Rosa von Praunheim
Documentary films about film directors and producers
2007 films
2007 documentary films
2000s German films